Bricaud is a surname. Notable people with the surname include:

 Jean Bricaud (1881–1934), French student of the occult and esoteric matters
 Thierry Bricaud (born 1969), French cyclist and sporting director

French-language surnames